Ganjineh-ye Zaruni (also Romanized as Ganjīneh-ye Ẕarūnī; also known as Gajīneh, Ganjīneh, and Gūjīneh) is a village in Kuhdasht-e Jonubi Rural District, in the Central District of Kuhdasht County, Lorestan Province, Iran. At the 2006 census, its population was 220, in 44 families.

References 

Towns and villages in Kuhdasht County